The Fokker F.XXII (also called Fokker F.22) was a 1930s Dutch four-engined 22-passenger airliner designed and built by Fokker.

Development
Developed as a smaller version of the Fokker F.XXXVI the F.XXII is a high-wing cantilever monoplane with a fixed tailwheel landing gear. It was powered by four Pratt & Whitney Wasp radial piston engines mounted in the wing leading edge. The first aircraft registered PH-AJP first flew in 1935, and was followed by two production aircraft all for KLM. A fourth aircraft was built for the Swedish airline AB Aerotransport.

A version with retractable landing gear and powered by two 650 hp Gnome-Rhône 9KF engines, the F.XXIII (or F.23), was developed in 1935. The heavier engines did not justify the revised performance, so the F.XXIII was never built.

Operational history
One KLM aircraft crashed in July 1935 and the other two continued in service until August 1939, when they were sold to British American Air Services and Scottish Aviation in the United Kingdom. A month later the British American Air Services aircraft was also acquired by Scottish Aviation as a navigation trainer. In October 1941, they were both impressed into service with the Royal Air Force and used as transports and crew trainers. One aircraft survived the war to be returned to Scottish Aviation who used it for services between Prestwick and Belfast until it was grounded at the end of 1947.

The Swedish aircraft, which was named Lappland, flew a regular Amsterdam–Malmo service until it was destroyed in an accident in June 1936.

Airspeed Ltd. in Great Britain arranged a license to build F.XXIIs for the British market as the Airspeed AS.16, but no orders were received.

Operators

Civil operators

KLM

AB Aerotransport

British American Air Service
Scottish Airlines
Scottish Aviation

Military operators

Royal Air Force
No. 24 Squadron RAF

Accidents and incidents
 On July 14, 1935, a KLM F.XXII (PH-AJQ, Kwikstaart) crashed on climbout from Schiphol Airport due to double engine failure, killing six of 20 on board.
 On June 9, 1936, an AB Aerotransport F.XXII (SE-ABA, Lappland) crashed at Bulltofta Airport while attempting an emergency landing following triple engine failure, killing one of 13 on board.
 On July 3, 1943, RAF F.XXII HM159 ditched at Loch Tarbert, Scotland due to an in-flight fire, killing all 20 passengers and crew on board.

Specifications (variant)

References

 The Illustrated Encyclopedia of Aircraft (Part Work 1982-1985), 1985, Orbis Publishing, Page 1895/6
 A.J. Jackson, British Civil Aircraft since 1919 Volume 2, 1974, Putnam, London, Page 373
Taylor, H.A.. Airspeed Aircraft since 1931. Putnam. 1970. London. 

1930s Dutch airliners
F 22
Aircraft first flown in 1935
Four-engined tractor aircraft
Four-engined piston aircraft